The St. Thomas and Eastern Railway  was a shortline railway division of the Trillium Railway, operating near St. Thomas, Ontario, Canada. The main commodities transported on the railway were grain, salt, and chemicals. St. Thomas and Eastern connected to Canadian National at Sarum, east of St Thomas, and Ontario Southland Railway (OSRX) in Tillsonburg. Total trackage was 33.6 miles. Trillium Railway ceased operations of the STER on December 20, 2013.

References

Ontario railways